Gay is an unincorporated community in Choctaw County, Oklahoma, United States.

History
A post office was established at Lenton, Indian Territory on October 22, 1901.  Its name changed to Gay, Oklahoma on April 28, 1908.  The post office closed on December 31, 1932.

The community is said to have been named after the town of Gay, Georgia.

At the time it was founded, Lenton, later Gay, was located in Kiamitia County, a part of the Apukshunnubbee District of the Choctaw Nation.

Notable person
Pauline Short Robinson (1915–1997), first African-American librarian in Denver, Colorado

References

Unincorporated communities in Choctaw County, Oklahoma
Unincorporated communities in Oklahoma